Nurdin Abdullah (born 7 February 1963) is an Indonesian politician and academician who was the 8th governor of South Sulawesi and regent of Bantaeng Regency between 2008 and 2018. He was arrested for corruption in 2021, and sentenced to five years' imprisonment.

Born in Parepare, he studied agricultural science in Japan's Kyushu University and returned home, running his own business and teaching before becoming the regent of Bantaeng for two terms. His time as regent saw significant economic growth within the regency, in addition to improvements in health. In the last year of his second term, he participated in the province's gubernatorial election and won.

Early life
Nurdin was born on 7 February 1963 as the eldest child of six. His father, Andi Abdullah, was a member of the Indonesian Armed Forces. Her mother Nuareny Abdullah originated from Soppeng. He claimed that he is a descendant of the Bantaeng kings - specifically, that his grandfather was the 35th King of Bantaeng.

Education
He went to junior high school (Sekolah Menengah Pertama/SMPN) in his hometown of Parepare, before going to Ujung Pandang for his senior high school studies, graduating in 1986. He continued his education in Hasanuddin University, studying agriculture and forestry. After obtaining his bachelors, he continued to Kyushu University in Fukuoka, Japan, earning his masters and doctorate by 1994.

Career
In 1997, he returned to South Sulawesi and established a company (PT Tokai Material Indonesia, later renamed PT Maruki Internasional) producing butsudan from wood for export to Japan in Makassar with the help of Japanese investors. He also held the post of president-director in three other Japanese companies.

Regent (2008–2018)
In 2008, Nurdin Abdullah ran with Andi Asli Mustajab in Bantaeng's regency election. The pair handily won the election, polling about 46 percent of the votes in a four-pair race in which they were supported by 10 political parties. Following the victory, Nurdin resigned from his teaching position at Hasanuddin University and from PT Maruki Internasional. They were sworn in on 6 August 2008.

When he took office, Bantaeng was one of 199 regencies across the country (and 13 in the province) to be classified as "undeveloped". Nurdin established a health service system, based on modified Nissan Elgrand cars received as aid from Japan, which was credited with significantly reducing the maternal mortality ratio. In economic terms, the regency's agricultural sector experienced a significant increase in crop yields and improved diversification under his tenure. Unemployment fell from 12 to 2.3 percent, with absolute poverty dropping from 21 to 5 percent. A 3,000-hectare industrial park was also set up, which was to include a nickel-alloy smelter. Annual income rose from IDR 5 million to IDR 27 million in 2015. Said smelter would be delayed in its operation, causing some controversy as Nurdin was accused of utilizing its (cancelled) opening as a false campaigning premise.

Implementing the lelang jabatan system also used by then-Surakarta mayor and later president Joko Widodo since 2009, Nurdin would win four Adipura awards in a row in addition to multiple other accolades from central government ministries. He was reelected in 2013, winning 84 percent of the votes. His second term expired on 15 August 2018.

He was also made a full professor at his alma mater Hasanuddin University in November 2017.

Governor (2018–2021)

In 2018, he registered to run in the province's gubernatorial election, with his tenure expiring the same year. He ran with Andi Sudirman Sulaiman, the younger brother of agriculture minister Amran Sulaiman. Supported by PDI-P, PKS and PAN, the pair would win the four-candidate election, securing victory in 16 regencies and cities within the province with a total of 1,867,303 votes (43.87%). He was sworn in by president Joko Widodo on 5 September 2018.

In 2019, a political conflict occurred when Sulaiman reassigned nearly 200 provincial government officials without approval from Abdullah. The dispute resulted in an investigation by the provincial legislature and the Ministry of Home Affairs and Sulaiman's order was rescinded.

Corruption charges
On 26 February 2021, he was arrested by the Corruption Eradication Commission. He was sentenced to five years' prison on 6 December 2021 by the Makassar Court for Corruption Crimes, and was required to pay Rp 2.2 billion + 350,000 Singaporean dollars.

References

1963 births
Living people
Hasanuddin University alumni
Kyushu University alumni
People from Parepare
Mayors and regents of places in South Sulawesi
Governors of South Sulawesi
Regents of places in Indonesia
Indonesian politicians convicted of corruption